Newburgh Burroughs was an eighteenth century  Irish Anglican priest.

The second son of Lewis Burroughs, himself a former Archdeacon of Derry, he was educated at Trinity College, Dublin. He was Chaplain to the John Sackville, 3rd Duke of Dorset then the incumbent at Bellaghy from 1787 to 1795. Burroughs was the Archdeacon of Derry "The Estate of the Diocess of Derry." Part IX. Archdeacons of Derry George Downham and William Alexander Reynell Ulster Journal of Archaeology Second Series, Vol. 4, No. 1 (Oct., 1897), pp. 56–64  from 1795 until his death in 1798.

His brother was the judge and politician Sir William Burroughs, 1st Baronet

References

1798 deaths
Archdeacons of Derry
Alumni of Trinity College Dublin